Susmit Bose (born November 1, 1950) is an Indian musician whose songs often deal with social issues, such as human rights, global peace and non violence. He has been making music since the 1970s and has performed widely in India and abroad. He participated in the International Folk Song Festival in Havana, Cuba in 1978. He has also been involved in making documentaries and films on socio cultural aspects of India. He composed music for the film "I am Kalam". After a hiatus of 25 years, he got back to the studio to record his critically acclaimed album "Public Issue" in 2006. In 2019, he appeared in If Not for You, a documentary about Kolkata's long lasting love affair with legendary singer-songwriter Bob Dylan.

Singing in English, he is considered by many as a source of social change for the generation of English educated Indians around the country and abroad.

'Song of the Eternal Universe', released in 2008, is an experimental album with the Bauls and is a follow up to the hugely successful 'Public Issue' and "Be the Change" released in 2006 and 2007 respectively. Public Issue was his return to the studio after many years. In 2009 he released "Rock 4 Life", a rock album on HIV/AIDS with eight Rock bands from the eight States in North East India. He also released his album 'Essentially Susmit Bose' in 2009. "Song of Dharma", the story of the Mahabharata in song was released at the end of 2010. In 2020, a double album titled Then & Now was released to celebrate fifty years of his music, comprising a reissue of his debut album Train to Calcutta and a compilation of songs from his later albums.

Major discography
2020 - Then & Now
2011 - Song of Dharma - the story of Mahabharata
2009 - Rock For Life 
2009 -Essentially Susmit Bose
2008- Song of the Eternal Universe
2006- Be The Change
2005- Public Issue
1990- Man of Conscience
1978- Train to Calcutta 
1973- Winter Baby

References

External links
 https://www.youtube.com/susmitbose
 https://open.spotify.com/artist/7afAWQUPNBnT6FeTkF9spN
 https://rollingstoneindia.com/review-susmit-boses-flavorful-new-double-album-then-now/

Living people
Indian male musicians
1950 births